Norman Mattoon Thomas (November 20, 1884 – December 19, 1968) was an American Presbyterian minister who achieved fame as a socialist, pacifist, and six-time presidential candidate for the Socialist Party of America.

Early years
Thomas was the oldest of six children, born November 20, 1884, in Marion, Ohio, to Emma Williams (née Mattoon) and Weddington Evans Thomas, a Presbyterian minister. Thomas had an uneventful Midwestern childhood and adolescence, helping to put himself through Marion High School as a paper carrier for Warren G. Harding's Marion Daily Star. Like other paper carriers, he reported directly to Florence Kling Harding. "No pennies ever escaped her," said Thomas. The summer after he graduated from high school his father accepted a pastorate at Lewisburg, Pennsylvania, which allowed Norman to attend Bucknell University. He left Bucknell after one year to attend Princeton University, the beneficiary of the largesse of a wealthy uncle by marriage. Thomas graduated magna cum laude from Princeton University in 1905.

After some settlement house work and a trip around the world, Thomas decided to follow in his father's footsteps and enrolled in Union Theological Seminary. He graduated from the seminary and was ordained as a Presbyterian minister in 1911.  After assisting the Rev. Henry Van Dyke at the fashionable Brick Presbyterian Church on Manhattan's Fifth Avenue, Thomas was appointed pastor of the East Harlem Presbyterian Church, ministering to Italian-American Protestants. Union Theological Seminary had been at that time a center of the Social Gospel movement and liberal politics, and as a minister, Thomas preached against American participation in the First World War. This pacifist stance led to his being shunned by many of his fellow alumni from Princeton, and opposed by some of the leadership of the Presbyterian Church in New York. When church funding of the American Parish's social programs was stopped, Thomas resigned his pastorate. Despite his resignation, Thomas did not formally leave the ministry until 1931, after his mother's death.

It was Thomas's position as a conscientious objector that drew him to the Socialist Party of America (SPA), a staunchly antimilitarist organization. When SPA leader Morris Hillquit made his campaign for mayor of New York in 1917 on an antiwar platform, Thomas wrote to him expressing his good wishes. To his surprise, Hillquit wrote back, encouraging the young minister to work for his campaign, which Thomas energetically did. Soon thereafter he himself joined the Socialist Party. Thomas was a Christian socialist.

Thomas was the secretary (then an unpaid position) of the pacifist Fellowship of Reconciliation even before the war. When the organization started a magazine called The World Tomorrow in January 1918, Thomas was employed as its paid editor. Together with Devere Allen, Thomas helped to make The World Tomorrow the leading voice of liberal Christian social activism of its day. In 1921, Thomas moved to secular journalism when he was employed as associate editor of The Nation magazine. In 1922 he became co-director of the League for Industrial Democracy. Later, he was one of the founders of the National Civil Liberties Bureau, the precursor of the American Civil Liberties Union.

Electoral politics
Thomas ran for office five times in quick succession on the Socialist ticket—for governor of New York in 1924, for mayor of New York in 1925, for New York State Senate in 1926, for alderman in 1927, and for mayor of New York again in 1929. In 1934, he ran for the US Senate in New York and polled almost 200,000 votes, then the second-best result for a Socialist candidate in New York state elections; only Charles P. Steinmetz polled more votes, almost 300,000 in 1922 when he ran for State Engineer.

Thomas's political activity also included attempts at the US presidency. Following Eugene Debs's death in 1926, there was a leadership vacuum in the Socialist Party. Neither of the party's two top political leaders, Victor L. Berger and Hillquit, was eligible to run for president because of their foreign birth. The third main figure, Daniel Hoan, was occupied as mayor of Milwaukee, Wisconsin. Down to approximately 8,000 dues-paying members, the Socialist Party's options were limited, and the little-known minister from New York with oratorial skills and a pedigree in the movement became the choice of the 1928 National Convention of the Socialist Party.

The 1928 campaign was the first of Thomas's six consecutive campaigns as the presidential nominee of the Socialist Party. As an articulate and engaging spokesman for democratic socialism, Thomas had considerably greater influence than the typical perennial candidate. Although most upper- and middle-class Americans found socialism unsavory, the well-educated Thomas—who often wore three-piece suits and looked and talked like a president—gained grudging admiration.

Thomas frequently spoke on the difference between socialism, the movement he represented, and communism and revolutionary Marxism. His early admiration for the Russian Revolution had turned into energetic anti-Stalinism. (Some revolutionaries thought him no better; Leon Trotsky criticized Thomas on more than one occasion.)

He wrote several books, among them his passionate defense of World War I conscientious objectors, Is Conscience a Crime?, and his statement of the 1960s social democratic consensus, Socialism Re-examined.

Socialist Party politics

At the 1932 Milwaukee Convention, Thomas and his radical pacifist allies in the party joined forces with constructive socialists from Wisconsin and a faction of young Marxist intellectuals called the "Militants" in backing a challenger to National Chairman Morris Hillquit. While Hillquit and his cohort retained control of the organization at this time, this action earned the lasting enmity of Hillquit's New York-based allies of the so-called "Old Guard". The diplomatic party peacemaker Hillquit died of tuberculosis the following year, lessening the stability of his faction.

At the 1934 National Convention of the Socialist Party, Thomas's connection with the Militants deepened when he backed a radical Declaration of Principles authored by his longtime associate from the radical pacifist journal The World Tomorrow, Devere Allen. The Militants swept to majority control of the party's governing National Executive Committee at this gathering, and the Old Guard retreated to their New York fortress and formalized their factional organization as the Committee for the Preservation of the Socialist Party, complete with a shadow Provisional Executive Committee and an office in New York City.

Thomas favored work to establish a broad Farmer–Labor Party upon the model of the Canadian Cooperative Commonwealth Federation, but remained supportive of the Militants and their vision of an "all-inclusive party", which welcomed members of dissident communist organizations (including Lovestoneites and Trotskyists) and worked together with the Communist Party USA in joint Popular Front activities. The party descended into a maelstrom of factionalism in the interval, with the New York Old Guard leaving to establish themselves as the Social Democratic Federation of America, taking with them control of party property, such as the Yiddish-language The Jewish Daily Forward, the English-language New Leader, the Rand School of Social Science, and the party's summer camp in Pennsylvania.

In 1937, Thomas returned from Europe determined to restore order in the Socialist Party. He and his followers in the party teamed up with the Clarity majority of the National Executive Committee and gave the green light to the New York Right Wing to expel the Appeal faction from the organization. These expulsions led to the departure of virtually the whole of the party's youth section, who affiliated to the new Trotskyist Socialist Workers Party. Demoralization set in and the Socialist Party withered, its membership level below that of 1928.

Causes

Thomas was initially as outspoken in opposing the Second World War as he had been with regard to the First World War. Upon returning from a European tour in 1937, he formed the Keep America Out of War Congress, and spoke against war, thereby sharing a platform with the non-interventionist America First Committee. In the 1940 presidential campaign he said Republican Wendell Willkie was the candidate of "the Wall Street war machine" and that he "would take us to war about as fast and about on the same terms as Mr. Roosevelt".

In testimony to Congress in January 1941 he opposed the proposed Lend Lease program of sending military supplies to Great Britain, calling it "a bill to authorize undeclared war in the name of peace, and dictatorship in the name of defending democracy". He said that the survival of the British Empire was not vital to the security of the United States, but added that he favored helping Britain to defend herself against aggression.

After the Japanese attack on Pearl Harbor on December 7, 1941, a bitter split took place in the Socialist Party regarding support for the war; Thomas reluctantly supported it, though he thought it could have been honorably avoided. His brother and many others continued their pacifist opposition to all wars. Thomas later wrote self-critically that he had "overemphasized both the sense in which it was a continuance of World War I and the capacity of nonfascist Europe to resist the Nazis".

Thomas was one of the few public figures to oppose President Roosevelt's incarceration of Japanese Americans following the attack on Pearl Harbor. He accused the ACLU of "dereliction of duty" when the organization supported the forced mass removal and incarceration. Thomas also campaigned against racial segregation, environmental depletion, and anti-labor laws and practices, and in favor of opening the United States to Jewish victims of Nazi persecution in the 1930s.

Thomas was an early proponent of birth control. The birth-control advocate Margaret Sanger recruited him to write "Some Objections to Birth Control Considered" in Religious and Ethical Aspects of Birth Control, edited and published by Sanger in 1926. Thomas accused the Catholic Church of hypocritical opinions on sex, such as requiring priests to be celibate and maintaining that laypeople should have sex only to reproduce. "This doctrine of unrestricted procreation is strangely inconsistent on the lips of men who practice celibacy and preach continence."

Thomas also deplored the secular objection to birth control because it originated from "racial and national" group-think. "The white race, we are told, our own nation—whatever that nation may be—is endangered by practicing birth control. Birth control is something like disarmament—a good thing if effected by international agreement, but otherwise dangerous to us in both a military and economic sense. If we are not to be overwhelmed by the 'rising tide of color' we must breed against the world. If our nation is to survive, it must have more cannon and more babies as prospective food for the cannon."

Thomas was also very critical of Zionism and of Israel's policies toward the Arabs in the postwar years (especially after the Suez Crisis) and often collaborated with the American Council for Judaism.

Later years
After 1945, Thomas sought to make the anti-Stalinist left the leader of social reform, in collaboration with labor leaders like Walter Reuther. In 1961, he released an album, The Minority Party in America: Featuring an Interview with Norman Thomas, on Folkways Records, which focused on the role of the third party.

Thomas's 80th birthday in 1964 was marked by a well-publicized gala at the Hotel Astor in Manhattan. At the event Thomas called for a cease-fire in Vietnam and read birthday telegrams from Hubert Humphrey, Earl Warren, and Martin Luther King Jr. He also received a check for $17,500 in donations from supporters. "It won't last long," he said of the check, "because every organization I'm connected with is going bankrupt."

In 1966, the conservative journalist and writer William F. Buckley, Jr chose Thomas to be the third guest on Buckley's new television interview show, Firing Line. In 1968, Thomas signed the "Writers and Editors War Tax Protest" pledge, vowing to refuse tax payments in protest against the Vietnam War.

Also in 1966, Thomas traveled to the Dominican Republic along with future Congressman Allard K. Lowenstein to observe that country's general election. The two were leaders of the "Committee on free elections in the Dominican Republic", an organization based in the United States that monitored the election. In the autumn of that year, Thomas received the second Eugene V. Debs Award for his work in promoting world peace.

Personal life
In 1910, Thomas married Frances Violet Stewart (1881–1947), the granddaughter of John Aikman Stewart, financial adviser to Presidents Lincoln and Cleveland, and a trustee of Princeton for many years. Together, they had three daughters and two sons:
 Mary "Polly" Thomas (1914–2010), who married Herbert C. Miller Jr, a professor and chairman of pediatrics at the University of Kansas
 Frances Thomas (1915–2015), who married John W. Gates, Jr. (died 2006)
 Rebekah Thomas (1918–1986), who married John D. Friebely
 William Stewart Thomas (1912-1988)
 Evan Welling Thomas II (1920–1999), who married Anna Davis (née Robins) in 1943
 Evan Welling Thomas III (b. 1951)

Death
Thomas died at the age of 84 on December 19, 1968, at a nursing home in Huntington, New York. Pursuant to his wishes, he was cremated and his ashes were scattered on Long Island.

Legacy
The Norman Thomas High School (formerly known as Central Commercial High School) in Manhattan and the Norman Thomas '05 Library at Princeton University's Forbes College are named after him, as is the assembly hall at the Three Arrows Cooperative Society, where he was a frequent visitor. He is also the grandfather of Newsweek columnist Evan Thomas and the great-grandfather of writer Louisa Thomas. 

A plaque in the Norman Thomas '05 Library reads: Norman M. Thomas, class of 1905. "I am not the champion of lost causes, but the champion of causes not yet won."

Works

 The Conquest of War. New York: Fellowship Press, 1917.
 War's Heretics : A Plea for the Conscientious Objector. Chicago: American Liberty Defense League, 1917.
 The case of the Christian Pacifists at Los Angeles, Cal. New York City: National Civil Liberties Bureau 1918
 The Conscientious Objector in America. New York: B. W. Huebsch, 1923.
 The League of Nations and the Imperialist Principle: A Criticism. New York: Foreign Policy Association, 1923.
 What Is Industrial Democracy? New York: League for Industrial Democracy, 1925.
 The Challenge of War: An Economic Interpretation. New York: League for Industrial Democracy, 1927.
 Is Conscience a Crime? New York: Vanguard Press, 1927.
 In the League and Out. New York: Foreign Policy Association, 1930.
 America's Way Out: A Program for Democracy. New York: Macmillan, 1931.
 Socialism and the Individual. Girard, KS: Haldeman-Julius Publications, 1931.
 The Socialist Cure for a Sick Society. New York: John Day Company, 1932.
 As I See It. New York: Macmillan, 1932.
 Why I Am a Socialist. New York: League for Industrial Democracy, 1932.
 What Socialism Is and Is Not. Chicago: Socialist Party of America, 1932.
 What's the Matter with New York: A National Problem. With Paul Blanshard. New York: Macmillan, 1932.
 A Socialist Looks at the New Deal. New York: League for Industrial Democracy, 1933.
 The New Deal: A Socialist Analysis. Chicago: Committee on Education and Research of the Socialist Party of America, 1934.
 Human Exploitation in the United States. New York: Frederick A. Stokes, 1934.
 The Choice Before Us. New York: Macmillan, 1934. (UK title: Fascism or Socialism?)
 The Plight of the Share Cropper. New York: League for Industrial Democracy, 1934.
 War – No Glory, No Profit, No Need. New York: Frederick A. Stokes, 1935.
 War As a Socialist Sees It. New York: League for Industrial Democracy, 1936.
 After the New Deal – What? New York: Macmillan, 1936.
 Debate: Which Road for American Workers – Socialist or Communist? New York: Socialist Call, 1936.
 Is the New Deal Socialism? An Answer to Al Smith and the American Liberty League. New York: National Office, Socialist Party, n.d. [c. 1936].
 Why I Am a Socialist. New York: League for Industrial Democracy, 1936.
 Shall labor support Roosevelt? Chicago : Labor League for Thomas and Nelson, 1936.
 Emancipate youth from toil, old age from fear, Chicago: Socialist Party, 1936.
 You Can't Cure Tuberculosis with Cough Drops. New York: Socialist Party, n.d. [1936].  – leaflet 
 Democracy versus dictatorship New York: League for Industrial Democracy, 1937.
 Socialism on the Defensive. New York: Harper and Brothers, 1938.
 Justice Triumphs in Spain! A Letter about the Trial of the POUM. With Devere Allen. Chicago: Socialist Party, n.d. [c. 1938].
 Collective Security Means War. Chicago: Socialist Party, 1938.
 Keep America Out of War: A Program. With Bertram D. Wolfe. New York: Frederick A. Stokes Co., 1939.
 Russia: Democracy or Dictatorship? With Joel Seidman. New York: League for Industrial Democracy, 1939.
 What's Behind the "Christian Front"? New York: Workers' Defense League, 1939.
 Stop the Draft : An Appeal to the American People. New York: Socialist National Headquarters, 1940.
 We Have a Future. Princeton, NJ: Princeton University Press, 1941.
 World Federation: What Are the Difficulties? New York: Post War World Council, 1942.
 Democracy and Japanese Americans. New York: Post War World Council, 1942.
 Martin Dies and Socialism. New York: Socialist Party, n.d. [c. 1943].
 Victory's Victims?  The Negro's Future. With A. Philip Randolph. Socialist Party, n.d. [c. 1943].
 What Is Our Destiny? Garden City, NY: Doubleday, Doran & Co., 1944.
 Conscription: The Test of Peace. New York:  Post War World Council, 1944.
 Russia: Promise and Performance. New York: Socialist Party, 1945.
 A socialist looks at the United Nations Syracuse, NY: Syracuse University Press,  1945.
 An Appeal to the Nations. New York: Socialist Party, 1947.
 The One Hope of Peace: Universal Disarmament Under International Control. New York: Post War World Council, 1947.
 Why I am a candidate New York: Socialist Party, 1948.
 How Can the Socialist Party Best Serve Socialism? An Argument in Support of the Position of the Majority of the National Executive Committee Concerning Electoral Activities. [New York]: [Socialist Party], 1949.
 A Socialist's Faith. New York: W. W. Norton, 1951.
 Democratic Socialism: A New Appraisal. New York: League for Industrial Democracy, 1953.
 The Test of Freedom. New York: W. W. Norton, 1954.
 Mr. Chairman, Ladies and Gentlemen... Reflections on Public Speaking. New York: Hermitage House, 1955.
 The Prerequisites for Peace. New York: W. W. Norton, 1959.
 Great Dissenters. New York: W.W. Norton, 1961.
 Eugene V. Debs in the Light of History. Terre Haute, IN: Eugene V. Debs Foundation, 1964.
 Socialism Re-Examined. New York: W. W. Norton, 1963.

References

Further reading
 Fleischmann, Harry, Norman Thomas: A Biography. New York, Norton & Co., 1964.
 Hyfler, Robert, Prophets of the Left: American Socialist Thought in the Twentieth Century. Westport, CT: Greenwood Press, 1984.
 Gregory, Raymond F., Norman Thomas: The Great Dissenter. Sanford, NC: Algora Publishing, 2008.
 Johnpoll, Bernard K., Pacifists Progress: Norman Thomas and the Decline of American Socialism. Chicago: Quadrangle Books, 1970.
 Seidler, Murray B., Norman Thomas: Respectable Rebel. Binghamton, New York, Syracuse University Press, 1967. Second Edition.
 Swanberg, W. A., Norman Thomas: The Last Idealist. New York, Charles Scribner and Sons, 1976.
 Thomas, Louisa, Conscience: Two Soldiers, Two Pacifists, One Family – A Test of Will and Faith in World War I. New York, The Penguin Press, 2011.
 Venkataramani, M.S., "Norman Thomas, Arkansas Sharecroppers, and the Roosevelt Agricultural Policies, 1933–1937", Mississippi Valley Historical Review, vol. 47, no. 2 (Sept. 1960), pp. 225–46. .

External links

 
 Letter from Thomas to Salah Bitar
 Thomas, Norman. Cuarenta anos de comunismo: promesas y realidades New York: Instituto de Investigaciones Internacionales del Trabajo,1957
 Norman Thomas's FBI files, hosted at the Internet Archive:
 Part 1
 Part 1A
 Part 2
 Part 14

 
Norman Thomas Papers, Tamiment Library and Robert F. Wagner Labor Archives at New York University Special Collections
 

1884 births
1968 deaths
19th-century Presbyterians
20th-century American male writers
20th-century American non-fiction writers
20th-century American politicians
20th-century Presbyterian ministers
American anti-capitalists
American anti-fascists
American Christian pacifists
American Christian socialists
American anti-racism activists
American Civil Liberties Union people
American conscientious objectors
American democratic socialists
American socialists
American male non-fiction writers
American pacifists
American political writers
American Presbyterians
American tax resisters
American anti-poverty advocates
American anti–Vietnam War activists
Anti–World War II activists
Activists for African-American civil rights
Candidates in the 1928 United States presidential election
Candidates in the 1932 United States presidential election
Candidates in the 1936 United States presidential election
Candidates in the 1940 United States presidential election
Candidates in the 1944 United States presidential election
Candidates in the 1948 United States presidential election
Members of the Executive of the Labour and Socialist International
The Nation (U.S. magazine) people
Non-interventionism
People from Cold Spring Harbor, New York
People from Marion, Ohio
People from Ridgefield, Connecticut
Presbyterian socialists
Princeton University alumni
Socialist Party of America politicians from New York (state)
Socialist Party of America presidential nominees
Writers from New York (state)
Writers from Ohio
American magazine founders